is a Japanese adult visual novel developed and published by Leaf. The game was released in both CD-ROM and DVD formats on September 26, 2003.

Characters 
  - TenIna's protagonist. He is an unfriendly young man with a bit of a temper. While he gets along with his best friends to a degree, Isao, and Kida, he is something of a loner during his time alone. He has no real interest in relationships, or "normal" life in general, and because of this he believes that the world would probably be better off without him. Despite being someone who lacks direction, he will be quick to act when the situation calls for it. His only real source of comfort is smoking cigarettes.
  - Kida's classmate. A simple girl that is seen as troublesome by most, and a true nuisance to Kida. Despite knowing that she is slow and somewhat bothersome to others, Touko feels she needs to do her best and contribute to the world. Unfortunately, the fact that Touko has never had a chance to prove herself has left her with a desire to find something that will give her own life some meaning. However, she finds that meaning upon meeting Kida and will do anything to preserve it.
  - Kida's classmate and Touko's best friend. A sharp-tongued and quick-witted girl who holds the position of class representative. Having known Touko all of her life, Shinobu has taken it upon herself to look after Touko and punish anyone who crosses her. This has done more harm than good for Touko, even if Shinobu is for the most part unaware of this. Her devotion is so strong that her classmates suspect that Shinobu and Touko might be romantically involved.
  - An older girl that works at the local cake shop. Asuna is generally amicable and is very willing to give advice, (and somewhat romantic). She instantly takes a liking to Kida upon meeting him, and vows to look after him. Though she seems to be quite comfortable with the role of "older sister" leading the "inexperienced younger man", her demeanor changes to that of a tense and quiet person whenever her past is brought up.
  - A girl from Kida's school. Yukio is respected and admired by the underclassmen, who see her as an intelligent and beautiful senpai. Though Yukio seems to have an ideal reputation and proves to be a very capable young woman, she has decided to abandon the idea of forming bonds and connections with others. She also seems to dislike being the object of people's affections.
  - An underclassman in the lacrosse team. Maho is a cute and energetic girl that happens to be Shimomura Isao's girlfriend. She thinks of Kida as her older brother and seems to feel more at ease around him than around her boyfriend. Maho doesn't play much of a role in the majority of ideas that are not her own.
  - Tokinori's little sister. Despite being younger, Emiri is easily the dominant out of the two, and to an extent has taken charge of the house. Aside from their arguments (which often end with her saying "I hope you die!"), Emiri still deeply cares for her brother. She simply learns to not expect much from him due to his lack of a general direction in life. On a side note, she strongly admires and respects Yukio.
  - Kida's best friend and Maho's boyfriend. Isao can be considered to be the opposite of Kida, and as such is outgoing and more of an optimist. He is completely focused on his plans for spending Christmas with Maho but is unaware of how uncomfortable she feels about the prospect of sex and sexuality during their time together.
  - The short-tempered owner of the cake shop "Ouinya Kyaku". He is Asuna's uncle through marriage and a talented pâtissier. His role is minimal for the most part, but serves as the adult figure amidst the chaotic events of the game. His role becomes more important in Asuna's storyline.
  - Kida, Shinobu and Touko's English teacher. An unpleasant man that is disliked by most students due to his tendency to show up at the worst possible moments.

Staff

 Producer - 
 Director - 
 Scenario - 
 Character Designs - , 
 Character Voices:
 (Touko Kurihara)
 (Shinobu Sakaki)
 (Asuna Asou)
 (Yukio Sumadera)
 (Maho Hazuki)
 (Emiri Kida)

Music (Theme Songs)
"December When There Is No Angel" has two theme songs, an opening theme named "I Hope So," and an ending theme named . "I Hope So" is sung by Haruna Ikeda and "Hitori" is sung by Akko.

References

External links
Official website 

2003 video games
Bishōjo games
Eroge
Japan-exclusive video games
Leaf (Japanese company) games
Romance video games
Single-player video games
Video games developed in Japan
Visual novels
Windows games
Windows-only games